Salt Springs Station is a small community in the Canadian province of Nova Scotia, located near Amherst.

References
Salt Springs Station, Nova Scotia

Communities in Cumberland County, Nova Scotia